The 2021 24 Hours of Daytona (formally the 2021 Rolex 24 at Daytona) was an endurance sports car race sanctioned by the International Motor Sports Association (IMSA). The event was held at Daytona International Speedway combined road course in Daytona Beach, Florida, on January 30–31, 2021. This event was the 59th running of the 24 Hours of Daytona, and the first of 12 races across multiple classes in the 2021 WeatherTech SportsCar Championship, as well as the first of four rounds in the 2021 Michelin Endurance Cup.

Entries

With the addition of the Le Mans Prototype 3 (LMP3) class, despite the onset of the COVID-19 pandemic, the number of entrants to the 24-hour race saw a marked improvement from the 2020 running of the event, with 50 entries registered. There were seven entries in the Daytona Prototype International (DPi) class, ten in LMP2, seven in LMP3, six in GT Le Mans (GTLM), and 20 in GT Daytona (GTD). Some notable entries include Chip Ganassi Racing, who are registered to participate in the Daytona Prototype international (DPi) class with the Cadillac DPi-V.R. This marks Chip Ganassi Racing's return to top-level sportscar competition in America after a one-year absence following the withdrawal of their Ford GTE program at the end of the 2019 season, and their first race in prototypes since the 2016 edition of the 24-hour race.

The Le Mans Prototype 2 (LMP2) class also saw a flourish of international interest, with ten entries registered, the highest entry count since LMP2 was made its own class. Several of the teams, such as DragonSpeed, Racing Team Nederland, and High Class Racing, are mainstays of the FIA World Endurance Championship. Many of the LMP2 driver rosters include world-class drivers, such as Nicolas Lapierre, Giedo van der Garde, and Ben Hanley, among others.

The entry count would drop to 49 for the race itself. Just prior to the testing weekend, the team owner of Porsche GT Daytona entrant Black Swan Racing, Tim Pappas, tested positive for COVID-19. He had contracted it after racing in the 2021 Dubai 24 Hour event two weeks prior. As a safety precaution, Pappas withdrew the entire team, which consisted of himself, Porsche factory driver Patrick Pilet, Patrick Lindsey, and Larry ten Voorde, who also tested positive for COVID-19 shortly after Pappas.

Pre-Race

Balance of Performance
Prior to the 24-hour race, and indeed the mandatory testing session that came a week prior, IMSA released a technical bulletin regarding the Balance of Performance for the 24 Hours of Daytona. Every year a unique set of BoP constraints are determined exclusively for the 24-hour event, due to the unique challenges the length of the race brings relative to the other events in the IMSA calendar. There was a large focus on changes in the GT classes. After winning both the 2019 and 2020 editions of the Rolex, the BMW M8 GTE was put at a 10-kilogram weight disadvantage, along with restricted levels of turbo boost. Meanwhile, the Porsche 911 RSR and Chevrolet Corvette C8.R were both given increases in the sizes of their air restrictors, with the latter being made 10 kilograms lighter. In GTD, several cars had their constraints changed, most notably the Porsche 911 GT3 R and 2020-edition-winning Lamborghini Huracan GT3. The former was given a hefty 20-kilogram weight increase, and the latter would run at restricted power levels.

Roar Before the 24

Motul Pole Award 100 
The Motul Pole Award 100 was held January 24. It was a qualifying race, awarding qualifying points and determining the starting lineup for the 24 Hours of Daytona.

Results 

Class winners in bold.

†: Post-event penalty. Moved to back of class.

Results
Class winners denoted in bold and with

References

24 Hours of Daytona
2021 WeatherTech SportsCar Championship season
Daytona
2021 24 Hours of Daytona